John Crichton (7 July 1917 – 7 January 1993) was a New Zealand furniture and interior designer.

Early life
Crichton was born in Bombay in 1917 and moved to England as a child. He studied at Birmingham College of Art. During World War II, he served as an official war photographer with the rank of Captain in the Royal Warwickshire Regiment, 1939–1945, assigned to the Fourteenth Army in Burma.

Design
He moved to New Zealand in 1949, establishing John Crichton Limited, a business and shop located on Kitchener Street in Auckland. He offered interior design services and designed and sold furniture. According to Douglas Lloyd Jenkins, Crichton "can lay claim to being the father of the modern New Zealand interior…" showing New Zealanders "how to blend a fascination with the materials and textures of the Pacific with the international vision of modern design."

He was a founder of the New Zealand Society of Industrial Designers (NZSID) in 1959, elected to membership soon after the Society's incorporation in 1960, and served on its council to 1966.

Crichton died in New Zealand on 7 January 1993, and he was buried at Purewa Cemetery, Auckland.

Collections
Examples of is work are held in the collections of Museum of New Zealand Te Papa Tongarewa.

References

1917 births
1993 deaths
British people in colonial India
Alumni of the Birmingham School of Art
Royal Warwickshire Fusiliers officers
War photographers
British emigrants to New Zealand
New Zealand furniture designers
New Zealand industrial designers
New Zealand interior designers
New Zealand photographers
People from Auckland
Burials at Purewa Cemetery
Photographers from Auckland